Tropheini is a tribe of African cichlids, endemic to Lake Tanganyika. The species in this tribe are mouthbrooders.

Genera 
Limnotilapia
Lobochilotes 
Petrochromis 
Pseudosimochromis 
Simochromis 
Tropheus

References

External links 
 http://www.helsinki.fi/~mhaaramo/metazoa/deuterostoma/chordata/actinopterygii/perciformes/labroidei/cichlidae/tropheini.html
 https://web.archive.org/web/20110607061112/http://www.ingentaconnect.com/content/klu/hydr/2003/00000500/F0030001/05138261;jsessionid=gf1j8h4qqp3d.alexandra
 https://web.archive.org/web/20090405230640/http://www.tropheini.com/tropheini.htm
 http://www.cichlidexplorer.com/category/lake-tanganyika-cichlids/tropheini/

 

Fish tribes
Cichlid fish of Africa